Caryocolum protectum is a moth of the family Gelechiidae. It is found in Kentucky, United States.

The length of the forewings is about 6 mm. The forewings are clay-coloured with scales tipped with orange-brown. Adults have been recorded on wing from early May to mid-July.

The larvae feed on the winter rosettes and later on the young shoots of Silene rotundifolia. In spring, they spin two opposite leaves together, boring into the tip of the stem and feeding on the terminal leaves. Pupation takes place from May to June. Larvae can be found from mid-October through the winter.

References

Moths described in 1965
protectum
Moths of North America